Surveillance is a 2008 American independent thriller film co-written and directed by Jennifer Lynch and starring Julia Ormond, Bill Pullman, Michael Ironside and French Stewart. The story is set in the Nebraska plains of United States. The film premiered "out of competition" and appeared in a midnight slot at the 2008 Cannes Film Festival. Surveillance is Lynch's second feature film, following a fifteen-year break after Boxing Helena.

Plot
A series of violent deaths and the disappearance of a young woman bring FBI agents Hallaway (Bill Pullman) and Anderson (Julia Ormond) to a town in rural Nebraska. They meet the three survivors of a mysterious bloodbath; the young Stephanie (Ryan Simpkins), the cocaine-addicted Bobbi (Pell James), and the foul-mouthed police officer Bennett (Kent Harper). Hallaway watches the trio's respective interviews with Captain Billings (Michael Ironside) and officers Wright (Charlie Newmark) and Degrasso (Gill Gayle), where they tell the story of what brought them there:

In a warped way to pass the day, Officer Bennett and his partner Officer Conrad (French Stewart) watch (both hidden from view) and shoot the tires of cars driving along an isolated county road, then convince the drivers their tires blew out as a result of their speeding, and threaten them afterwards. They do so to one young couple then let them go.

A bit later, Stephanie, traveling on vacation with her family, sees a car (the couple's) with blood on it and tells it to her oblivious mother (Cheri Oteri). Bobbi, using drugs with her boyfriend Johnny (Mac Miller), is in a car right behind them. At a rest stop, both girls learn a pair of killers are responsible for a string of murders and likely the woman's disappearance. Stephanie's stepfather Steven (Hugh Dillon) supposedly speeds and their car's tire is shot by Bennett. Bobbi and Johnny are about to offer help, but the officers arrive and harass all of them, making Steven put Conrad's gun in his mouth and making Bobbi swear at Johnny. After all of this, Stephanie tells the officers about the bloody car she saw earlier. The officers leave to investigate.

Steven gets to work changing the tire, and Bobbi gets out to talk with Stephanie's family, who all feel violated by the officers. Simultaneously, after passing a white van, Bennett and Conrad find the car Stephanie described farther down the road, with evidence of an altercation, and race back towards the van. The van plows into the back of Johnny's car, killing him and Steven. A dead man is at the wheel, and a live person, covered in a black bag, is sitting in the passenger seat of the van, whom Bobbi tries to save. Bennett and Conrad arrive back at the scene. In the chaos, Conrad is killed and persons emerge from the van wearing rubber masks, kill Stephanie's mother and brother, and knock Bennett unconscious. Stephanie and Bobbi take refuge in the police car.

Presently, Hallaway and Anderson are trying to figure things out when bodies are discovered in a motel nearby. Anderson takes Wright and Degrasso to the scene, leaving Hallaway with Bobbi, Billings, Bennett, and Stephanie, who whispers something in Hallaway's ear after Anderson leaves. Hallaway talks with the three others, while Degrasso discovers nude pictures of Anderson and Hallaway. Leafing through them in Anderson's backseat, Degrasso is shocked to see the agents with the body of a dead woman. Before he can react, Anderson shoots both Degrasso and Wright dead, then dumps both bodies by the roadside. Hallaway, meanwhile, reveals that he was at the bloodbath earlier, and reveals he and Anderson are in fact the killers. Hallaway kills Billings, and when Anderson returns Bennett and Bobbi are also murdered.

A phone message left at the police station reveals the bodies at the motel are those of the missing woman and two real FBI Agents. As Anderson and Hallaway drive away they see Stephanie standing out in a field by the side of the road. Hallaway relates to Anderson that the little girl was on to them all along so he let her go free. Anderson tells Hallaway, "I think that's the most romantic thing in the whole world." Stephanie watches their vehicle disappear into the distance.

Cast
 Julia Ormond as Elizabeth Anderson
 Bill Pullman as Sam Hallaway
 Pell James as Bobbi Prescott
 Ryan Simpkins as Stephanie
 Michael Ironside as Captain Billings
 French Stewart as Officer Jim Conrad
 Kent Harper as Officer Jack Bennett
 Mac Miller as Johnny
 Hugh Dillon as Dad
 Cheri Oteri as Mom
 Gill Gayle as Officer Degrasso

Production
Different film stocks were processed in different ways to provide the varying states of minds and perspectives that belong to the various characters in the film: the two local police officers' POV is sepia toned, to reflect their power, while over-saturation was employed for the illicit drug-using couple, and a "super sharp and super clear" depiction for the young girl.

Reception

Critical response
Overall, reviews of the film were mixed. The aggregator website Rotten Tomatoes reported a 55% approval rating with an average score of 5.19/10, based on 76 reviews. The website's consensus reads, "This dark psycho-thriller from Jennifer Lynch, is violent, sharp and baffling, but not to everyone's taste." On Metacritic the film achieved a score of 31 out of 100 based on 12 reviews, which indicates "generally unfavorable reviews".

Accolades
In October 2008, the film took the top prize at the Festival de Cine de Sitges.

The film made history at the New York City Horror Film Festival when Jennifer Lynch became the first female to win the Best Director award and Ryan Simpkins became the first child to win the Best Actress award at the fest.

See also
 List of films featuring surveillance

References

External links
 
 

2008 films
Films directed by Jennifer Chambers Lynch
Films shot in Saskatchewan
2008 thriller films
2008 independent films
Films about con artists
American thriller films
2000s English-language films
2000s American films